San Bernardo is a city of Chile, part of the Greater Santiago conurbation. Administratively, it is a commune and the capital of the Maipo Province in the Santiago Metropolitan Region. It is the seat of the Roman Catholic Diocese of San Bernardo.

Demographics
Of these, 241,138 (97.7%) lived in urban areas and 5,624 (2.3%) in rural areas. The population grew by 29.3% (55,905 persons) between the 1992 and 2002 censuses.

Stats
Population: 286,228 (2006 projection)
Average annual household income: US$16,035 (PPP, 2009)
Population below poverty line: 20.9% (2006)

Administration
As a commune, San Bernardo is a third-level administrative division of Chile administered by a municipal council, headed by an alcalde who is directly elected every four years. The 2016-2020 alcalde is Nora Cuevas Contreras (UDI). The council has the following members:
 Amparo García Saldias (UDI)
 Christopher White Bahamondes (PS)
 Leonel Cadiz Soto (PS)
 Luis Navarro Ormeño (PRSD)
 Orfelina Bustos Carmona (PDC)
 Raimundo Camus Varas (UDI)
 Ricardo Rencoret Klein (UDI)
 Sebastián Tapia Macaya (PDC)
 Sebastián Orrego Cisternas (RN)
 Soledad Perez Peña (IND)

The regional intendant, appointed by the president, is Claudio Orrego Vicuña.

Within the electoral divisions of Chile, San Bernardo is represented in the Chamber of Deputies by Ramón Farías (PPD) and José Antonio Kast (UDI) as part of the 30th electoral district, (together with Buin, Paine and Calera de Tango). The commune is represented in the Senate by Guido Girardi Lavín (PPD) and Andrés Allamand (RN) as part of the 7th senatorial constituency (Santiago-West).

Chilean folklore capital
At a national level, San Bernardo is characterized as the capital of Chilean folkloric traditions.
This is mainly due to two annual events held in the commune: the "Festival Nacional del Folklore de San Bernardo" (English: San Bernardo's National Festival of Folklore) and "Abril Cuecas Mil" (English: A Thousand Cuecas April).

Festival Nacional del Folklore
The Festival Nacional del Folklore de San Bernardo has been held at the end of February since 1972 and draws participants and spectators from all around the country. The festival consists performances of traditional and folkloric Chilean music, dance, and singing, as well as competitions held at school, corporate, and community levels. It also features participants from other countries who are invited to showcase their respective folkloric traditions. An additional part of the festivals is the "Feria de Artesanía Tradicional" (English: Traditional Crafts Fair"), which centres around showcasing and promoting traditional artisanal gastronomy, arts and crafts from Chile and other Latin American cultures.

Abril Cuecas Mil
Abril Cuecas Mil is held annually on the last Saturday of April, since 1993. First proposed by professor Arturo García Araneda, a San Bernardino folklorist, the event centres around Cueca, Chile's national dance. The event lasts for about 30 continuous hours and consists of a line-up of musicians, bands, or folkloric groups playing a thousand Cuecas for an open floor, where anyone is welcomed to partake in the dancing. Participants range from enthusiasts and amateurs to professional and trained dancers. The style of Cueca usually alternates between more traditional folkloric styles during the day (e.g., salon, campesina, etc.) and more risqué styles during the night (e.g., porteña, brava, etc.).

Chena's Pucará
The Chena hills, located in the basin of San Bernardo, are home to an Incan sacred site known as the Huaca of Chena or Chena's Pucará. Initially thought to be a fortress, the structure in the southern tip of the Chena hills has been denominated as a huaca (Quechuan Wak'a) a sacred place, a space of ritual use. The Chena's Pucará was observed to have a zoomorphic design, resembling a puma, which is a characteristic of Incan ceremonial and sacred structures. The word Chena (the name of the hills) means puma in oestrous cycle in the Quechuan language.

Subsequent investigations have further supported the sacred denomination by revealing the structure to be composed of three separate edifications; an outside perimetral wall, a middle perimetral wall and the central enclosure, all which are consistent with Incan architectural tripartition designs. 
Furthermore, the principle structure's design is consistent with the structural designs of Incan Ushnu (place of observation). This observatory status has been confirmed by the structure's seemingly perfect lineation of its altar with the first ray of sun during the winter solstice (21 June) and the summer solstice (21 December).

Currently, the commune of San Bernardo lacks the resources to establish proper administration, maintenance, or security of the area, and Chena's Pucará faces physical abandonment, neglect and banalisation, including dismantling of walls and defecation on the altar. However, in recent years Quechuan and Aymará populations have become interested in negotiating with the authorities for ritualistic and occupation rights in the area.

Sports
San Bernardo Unido
Atlético San Bernardo

References

External links
 Municipality of San Bernardo 

Capitals of Chilean provinces
Populated places established in 1821
Populated places in Maipo Province
1821 establishments in Chile